Selfie is a 2019 comedy film starring an ensemble cast of actors. The film premiered at the 2019 Festival International du Film Grolandais de Toulouse (FIFIGROT).

Cast
 Manu Payet
 Blanche Gardin
 Elsa Zylberstein
 Max Boublil
 Finnegan Oldfield
 Anne Benoît
 Julia Piaton
 Alma Jodorowsky
 Fanny Sidney

References

External links
 

2019 films
2019 comedy films
French comedy films
2010s French-language films
2010s French films
Films with screenplays by Thomas Bidegain